The European Society for Structural Integrity (ESIS) is an international non-profit engineering scientific society.
Its purpose is to create and expand knowledge about all aspects of structural integrity and the dissemination of that knowledge. The goal is to improve the safety and performance of structures and components.

History

The purpose of European Structural Integrity Society dates back to November 1978 during the summer school in Darmstadt (Germany). At the time, the name was European Group on Fracture. Between 1979 and 1988 the first technical committees were created, the first technical committee had the designation of Elasto-Plastic Fracture Mechanics. The initial idea was to reproduce in Europe the same as the ASTM committee. The first president of European Structural Integrity Society was Dr. L.H. Larsson (European Commission Joint Research Centre). ESIS has a total of 24 technical committees and national groups in each European country.

The current president of ESIS is Prof. Francesco Iacoviello from the University of Cassino and Southern Lazio (Italy).

Scientific Journals

ESIS is institutionally responsible for the following scientific journals:
 Engineering Failure Analysis
 Engineering Fracture Mechanics
 International Journal of Fatigue
 Theoretical and Applied Fracture Mechanics
 Procedia Structural Integrity

Organization of International Conferences 
ESIS is the organizer or supporter of various international conference series:
 ECF, European Conference on Fracture (biennial)
 ICSI, International Conference on Structural Integrity (biennial)
 IRAS, International Conference on Risk Analysis and Safety of Complex Structures and Componentes (biennial)

Awards 
ESIS, at its events, confers the following awards:
 The Griffith Medal
 The August-Wöhler Medal
 The Award of Merit
 Honorary Membership
 The Young Scientist Award

References

External links 
European Structural Integrity Society Official Website

Engineering organizations